Izhar ul-Haqq or Izhar al-Haq is a book by Rahmatullah Kairanawi. Kairanwi had written this book in response to the allegations made by certain Christian missionaries against Islam and especially to counter Meezanul Haqq, a book written by Pfander against Islam. The book was originally written in Arabic in 1864, this six-volume book was later translated (or summarized) into English, Turkish, Urdu and Bengali.

Christine Schirrmacher describes the book saying:

Sources 
Kairanawi made use of Western Biblical criticism as well as theological works.

Urdu translation
Late Maulana Akbar Ali Khan of Darul Uloom Karachi translated the book into Urdu. Taqi Usmani wrote commentary to it. He also wrote a preface to the book which now comes as a separate book, What is Christianity? The translation and commentary have been published in three volumes.

References

External links
 
English and Arabic versions.

1864 non-fiction books
19th-century Arabic books
Books about Islam
Christianity and Islam
Books critical of Christianity
19th-century Indian books
Indian religious texts
Indian non-fiction books
Kalam
Sunni literature
Maturidi literature
Deobandi literature
Islamic theology books